Kirat Singh Rana or Rana Kirat Singh (1763–1835) was a Jat ruler of Gohad state (1803–1805) in Madhya Pradesh, India. He was the first also a ruler of Dholpur (princely state) (1805–1835).

References

History of Madhya Pradesh
Rulers of Dholpur state
People from Bhind
1763 births
1835 deaths